Iosif Konstantinovich Berdiev (26 November 1924, Poltoratsk - 27 February 1992, Kyiv, Ukraine) was a Soviet gymnast.

Berdiev was High coach school of Leningrad Military Institute of Physical Culture and Sport (1953), competed for SKA (Leningrad).

Achievements
 Title Meritorious master of sport of USSR (1955)
 1948-1953, 1955 USSR champion in Vault
 1952 Olympic champion (team)

External links
 Iosif Berdiyev Biography and Olympic Results, Olympics at Sports-Reference.com

Soviet male artistic gymnasts
Olympic gymnasts of the Soviet Union
Olympic gold medalists for the Soviet Union
1924 births
1992 deaths
Olympic medalists in gymnastics
Gymnasts at the 1952 Summer Olympics
Medalists at the 1952 Summer Olympics
Soviet military personnel of World War II
Honoured Masters of Sport of the USSR